Ilyinsky is a village in the Olonetsky District of the Republic of Karelia, Russia, the administrative center of the Ilyinskoye rural settlement.

Geography 

Located 19 km west of Olonets, on the Olonka River, four kilometers east of the coast of Lake Ladoga.

History 

The first settlement in the territory of the modern settlement was the village of Yuksila, mentioned in the scribe book of the Obonezhskaya Pyatina in 1651.

In 1927, the Alavoine sawmill was organized.

In 1932, the Alavoine state farm was launched with the development of the “Syandeb Marshes”. In 1939, the Alavoine state farm became one of the largest farms in the Karelian Autonomous Soviet Socialist Republic.

In 1957, the villages of Vinokurovo, Goshkila, Kotchila, Martoil, Rugoil, Sloboda, Unoil, Yuksil and Yakkoil were included in the settlement.

In 1962, the workers' settlement of Ilyinsky was formed, with the inclusion of settlements - the village of Lesozavodsky, Old Plant, Kuykka, Ukrainka, Nurmoyla, Ilyinskoye, Zivchala, Antula and Ilyinskaya station. He retained the status of an urban-type settlement until 1991.

Economy

industry 
OJSC “Pedigree farm“ ”Ilinskoe” is working in the village. Breeding specialization is dairy farming. The farm is the undisputed leader in the production of milk in the Republic of Karelia.

Trading 
In the village there are such large retail chains as «Pyaterochka», «Magnit». There is an issue point of the «Ozon» online store.

Financial services 
A branch of the Russian commercial bank «Sberbank» is located in the village.

Transport

Automobile communication 
The highway 86K-8 Olonets-Pitkäranta-Leppyasylta passes through the village.

Railway 
There is a railway station Ilyinskaya   (line Yanisyarvi - Lodeynoye Pole) of the Volkhovstroevsky branch of the October Railway.

Education and culture 

In 1954, the library was opened - Kotchilsky rural library. Works Alavoine secondary school, children's music school. In 2006, the Alavoine Municipal Institution, the Center for Club Initiatives, was established.

Historical monuments 
Historical monuments are preserved in the village:

 St. Nicholas Adriano-Andrusovsky Monastery

 Mass grave of soviet soldiers who died during the Continuation War (1941-1944)

 The grave of the Hero of the Soviet Union , the Red Navy man A. I. Moshkin

 Grave of the Hero of the Soviet Union, Lieutenant Colonel V. N. Leselidze

Natural monuments 
2 km northwest of the village there is a state regional swamp monument of nature — a swamp near the Olonka River with an area of 42.0 hectares, a typical swamp complex of the eastern coast of Lake Ladoga.

In the vicinity of the village in the fields there is the largest parking lot of migratory birds in Northern Europe and the state landscape reserve "Andrusovo" — a specially protected natural area.

Streets 

 4 five - year plan street
 Antulskaya street
 Bolotnaya street
 Gagarin street
 street Ganicheva
 street  Druzhby Narodov
 street Zavodskaya
 alleyway Zavodskoy
 street Zarechnaya
 street Zivchalskaya
 street Komsomolskaya
 street Kotchilskaya
 street Extreme
 street Leselidze
 street Lesnaya
 street Lunacharsky
 street Molodezhnaya
 street Moshkina
 street Embankment
 street Novaya

 street Oktyabrskaya
 street Pervomayskaya
 street Pesochnaya
 street Pionerskaya
 street Sadovaya
 street Sosnovy bor
 alleyway Stationny
 street Starozavodskaya
 street Old Center

 street Ukrainian

References

Notes

Sources

Rural localities in the Republic of Karelia
Former urban-type settlements of Karelia